The 2009 M&M Meat Shops Canadian Junior Curling Championships was held January 31-February 8 at the Sunwave Centre and the Salmon Arm Curling Club in Salmon Arm, British Columbia. The winning teams of Prince Edward Island's Brett Gallant in the men's event and Manitoba's Kaitlyn Lawes in the women's event would go on to represent Canada at the 2009 World Junior Curling Championships in Vancouver.

Men's

Teams

Standings

Results

Draw 1

Draw 2

Draw 3

Draw 4

Draw 5

Draw 6

Draw 7

Draw 8

Draw 9

Draw 10

Draw 11

Draw 12

Draw 13

Draw 14

Draw 15

Draw 16

Draw 17

Draw 18

Playoffs

Semifinal

Final

Women's

Teams

Standings

Results

Draw 1

Draw 2

Draw 3

Draw 4

Draw 5

Draw 6

Draw 7

Draw 8

Draw 9

Draw 10

Draw 11

Draw 12

Draw 13

Draw 14

Draw 15

Draw 16

Draw 17

Draw 18

Playoffs

Semifinal

Final

Qualification

Ontario
The Pepsi Ontario Junior Curling Championships were held January 7–11 at the Gananoque Curling Club in Gananoque.

Rachel Homan and her rink from the Ottawa Curling Club defeated Katie Morrissey of the neighbouring Rideau Curling Club 11-4 in the women's final. Team Homan went undefeated at the tournament, finishing with an 8-0 record. Morrissey had beaten Danielle Inglis of Burlington 8-3 in the semifinal. Both rinks finished tied after round robin play.

In the men's final, Bowie Abbis-Mills out of the KW Granite Club defeated Neil Sinclair of Manotick 6-5. Abbis-Mills won his semifinal match against Ilderton's Chris Liscumb rink 14-6. Sinclair earned a bye to the final after posting the best round robin record at 6-1. Both Abbis-Mills and Liscombe finished the round robin with 5-2 records.

References

External links
Men's results
Women's results

Junior Curling Championships, 2009
Canadian Junior Curling Championships
Curling in British Columbia
Salmon Arm
2009 in British Columbia
January 2009 sports events in Canada
February 2009 sports events in Canada